Gaighata Government Polytechnic , (also known as Chandpara Polytechnic College), established in 2017, is a government polytechnic located in Chandpara, West Bengal. This polytechnic is affiliated to the West Bengal State Council of Technical Education, and recognised by AICTE, New Delhi. This polytechnic offers diploma courses in Mechanical Engineering, Electrical Engineering and Civil Engineering.

References

External links
 Admission to Polytechnics in West Bengal for Academic Session 2006-2007
http://www.icvpolytechnic.com/

Technical universities and colleges in West Bengal
Universities and colleges in North 24 Parganas district
Educational institutions established in 2017
2017 establishments in West Bengal